The 2019–20 California Golden Bears women's basketball team represented University of California, Berkeley during the 2019–20 NCAA Division I women's basketball season. The Golden Bears, led by first year head coach Charmin Smith, played their home games at the Haas Pavilion as members of the Pac-12 Conference.

Roster

Schedule

|-
!colspan=9 style=|Exhibition

|-
!colspan=9 style=|Non-conference regular season

|-
!colspan=9 style=| Pac-12 regular season

|-
!colspan=9 style=| Pac-12 Women's Tournament

Rankings

^Coaches did not release a Week 2 poll.

See also
2019–20 California Golden Bears men's basketball team

References

California Golden Bears women's basketball seasons
California
Golden Bear
Golden Bear